Banks Island is an island on the coast of the Canadian province of British Columbia. It is located south of Prince Rupert, on Hecate Strait, east of and opposite Haida Gwaii. To the east of Banks Island is Pitt Island and McCauley Island, both across Principe Channel. To the west is Bonilla Island. To the south lies the archipelago of the Estevan Group, beyond which is Caamaño Sound.

The island reaches  in elevation. It is located within the Skeena-Queen Charlotte Regional District.

Banks Island was named in 1787 by Archibald Menzies, botanist and surgeon of the fur trading vessel , in honour of Sir Joseph Banks, who was then president of the Royal Society and had accompanied James Cook during the exploratory voyages of 1768–1771. Banks was instrumental in encouraging British fur trading voyages to the Pacific Northwest, such as Duncan's.

History
In late August, 1787, the British fur traders James Colnett and Charles Duncan arrived at Banks Island. They anchored their two ships, Prince of Wales and Princess Royal at the south end of Banks Island in Calamity Bay (which they named Port Ball). The ships remained there for eleven weeks while being repaired. During this time there was a series of first contact encounters between the British and some of the Kitkatla Tsimshian. Minor conflicts escalated into larger ones, including the theft of a British long boat. Violence soon followed, with the use of muskets, pistols, and cannons by the British. A number of Tsimshian were killed, wounded, and taken captive. Also during their time at Calamity Bay the British used boats to explore the complex waterways of the region, including Principe Channel, Douglas Channel, and Laredo Sound, in the process producing the first significant maps of this part of the coast.

The Spanish explorer Jacinto Caamaño explored the region in 1792, passing through Principe Channel in the corvette Aranzazu. Caamaño was aided by copies of maps made by Colnett. The incompletely explored inlets on the maps prompted the Viceroy of New Spain to order an exploratory expedition, which was given to Caamaño. During his voyage, Caamaño spent a month's sojourn at the southern end of Pitt Island, during which time he had considerable interaction with the Tsimshian of Pitt and Banks Islands.

References

Islands of British Columbia
North Coast of British Columbia
Tsimshian